Tales of Two Who Dreamt is a Canadian documentary film, directed by Nicolás Pereda and Andrea Bussmann and released in 2016. The film centres on the Laskas, a Roma family of immigrants from Hungary to Canada, who are preparing for their immigration hearing.

The film premiered at the 2016 Berlin Film Festival, and had its Canadian premiere at the 2016 Vancouver International Film Festival.

References

External links

2016 films
2016 documentary films
Canadian documentary films
Mexican documentary films
Films directed by Nicolás Pereda
Films directed by Andrea Bussmann
Films shot in Toronto
2010s Canadian films
2010s Mexican films